A reclining Buddha is an image that represents Buddha lying down and is a major iconographic theme in Buddhist art. It represents the historical Buddha during his last illness, about to enter the parinirvana. He is lying on his right side, his head resting on a cushion or relying on his right elbow, supporting his head with his hand.

This pattern seems to have emerged at the same time as other representations of the Buddha in the Greco-Buddhist art of Gandhara.

In Thai art 

For Thai Buddha attitudes, the reclining Buddha can refer to three different episodes, whilst the attribute of each remains unclear.
 Nirvana attitude 
 Teaching the Rahu Asurin attitude
 Sleeping attitude

Notable examples 

Burma:
 Winsein Tawya Buddha (Mawlamyaing) - 
 Thanboddhay Pagoda (Monywa) - 
 Myathalyaung Buddha (Bago) - 
 Lawka Tharahpu Buddha (Dawei) - 
 Chaukhtatgyi Buddha Temple (Yangon) - 
 Shwethalyaung Buddha (Bago) - 
 Manuha Temple (Bagan)
 Phowintaung, near Monywa

Cambodia:
 West side of the Baphuon in Angkor
 Monolithic Buddha of the Phnom Kulen (lying on his left side)
 Golden gilded Buddha on Sambok Mountain in Kratié Province (on his right side)

China
Dafo Temple, Zhangye

Pakistan:
 Bhamala Buddha Parinirvana which is 1,800 years old, oldest in the world.
India:
 Cave #26 of Ajanta

Indonesia:
 Maha Vihara Mojopahit, Trowulan, East Java.

Japan
 Kongōbu-ji at Mount Kōya.
 Nanzoin temple, in Fukuoka Prefecture  - 

Malaysia:
 Wat Chayamangkalaram in Pulau Tikus, Penang
 Sam Poh Tong Temple in Ipoh, Perak
 Wat Phothivihan in Tumpat, Kelantan

Sri Lanka:
 Dambulla
 Gal Vihara in Polonnaruwa (12th century)

Tajikistan:
 Buddha in Nirvana of Ajina-Tepa (13 meters long), on display in the National Museum in Dushanbe

Thailand:
 Wat Dhammachaksemaram (reclining Buddha of the 7th century in Dvaravati style coming from Muang Sema)
 Wat Lokaya Sutharam in Ayutthaya
 Wat Pho of Bangkok - 
United States
Linh Son Temple in Santa Fe, Texas

See also
 Reclining Vishnu
 Bhishma on bed of arrows

References

External links 

Buddha statues
Buddhist iconography